Acada is an Afrotropical genus of skippers.

Species
Acada annulifer (Holland, 1292)
Acada biseriata (Mabille, 1393)

References

External links

Natural History Museum Lepidoptera genus database
3f64/mode/1up Seitz, A. Die Gross-Schmetterlinge der Erde 13: Die Afrikanischen Tagfalter. Plate XIII 77

Hesperiinae
Hesperiidae genera